"Stolen Moments" is a jazz standard composed by Oliver Nelson. It is a 16-bar piece though the solos are on a conventional minor blues structure. The recording of the song on Nelson's 1961 album, The Blues and the Abstract Truth, led to it being more generally covered. The tune was given lyrics when Mark Murphy recorded his version in 1978.

History

The piece first appeared as "The Stolen Moment" on the 1960 album Trane Whistle by Eddie "Lockjaw" Davis, which was largely written and co-arranged by Oliver Nelson. It was not marked out as anything special, in fact the cover notes only mention that the trumpet solo is by Bobby Bryant and that Eric Dolphy's bass clarinet can be heard briefly on the closing. However, in the liner notes to Eric Dolphy: The Complete Prestige Recordings, Bill Kirchner states that this incorrectly credits Dolphy with playing what is actually the baritone saxophone of George Barrow, with Dolphy's contribution to the piece being the second alto behind Nelson.

The first recording of the song to gain attention was the version on Nelson's own 1961 album, The Blues and the Abstract Truth. Ted Gioia describes this version of as "a querulous hard bop chart that makes full use of the horns on hand with its rich spread-out voicings." Gioia also observes "a clever hook in the song – its brief resolve into the tonic major in bar four of the melody, one of the many interesting twists in Nelson's original chart." Nelson's solo on this version contains "possibly the most famous" use of the augmented scale in jazz.

Singer Mark Murphy wrote lyrics for his 1978 version. Gail Fisher later wrote different lyrics to Nelson's original melody. They were first recorded on the 1987 album The Carmen McRae – Betty Carter Duets. This vocal version of "Stolen Moments" was given the alternative title "You Belong to Her".

Recordings
 Emilie-Claire Barlow – Sings (1998)
 Kenny Barron, Jay Leonhart, and Al Foster – Super Standard (2004)
 Kenny Burrell – Moon and Sand (1979)
 Eddie "Lockjaw" Davis –  Trane Whistle (1960)
 Ahmad Jamal, The Awakening (1970)
 J. J. Johnson – J.J.! (1964)
 Stanley Jordan – Stolen Moments (1991)
 Joe Locke and Kenny Barron – But Beautiful (1991)
 Herbie Mann with Chick Corea –Standing Ovation at Newport (1965)
 Tina May –  'Time Will Tell...'  (1996)
 Carmen McRae and Betty Carter – The Carmen McRae – Betty Carter Duets (1987)
 Mark Murphy – Stolen Moments (1978)
 Oliver Nelson – The Blues and the Abstract Truth (1961)
 Oliver Nelson – Stolen Moments (1975)
 Jimmy Raney and Doug Raney – Stolen Moments (1979)
 Lee Ritenour – Stolen Moments (1990)
 Mary Stallings – Songs Were Made to Sing (2019)
 Andy Summers and Victor Biglione – Strings of Desire (1998)
 Turtle Island Quartet – Turtle Island String Quartet (1988)
 United Future Organization – Stolen Moments: Red Hot + Cool (1994)
 Kazumi Watanabe – Mo' Bop III (2011)
 Phil Woods – Americans Swinging in Paris (1968)
 Frank Zappa and Sting – Broadway the Hard Way (1988)

Sources

External links
 

Jazz songs
Sixteen bar sections
1960 songs
1960s jazz standards